The Washington D.C. Area Film Critics Association Award for Best Adapted Screenplay is one of the annual awards given by the Washington D.C. Area Film Critics Association.

Winners and nominees

2000s

2010s

2020s

Screenplay, Best Adapted
Screenwriting awards for film